A litigon (/ˌlaɪˈtaɪɡən/) is a rare, second-generation hybrid from a female tigon (a hybrid between a male tiger and a female lion) and a male lion, specifically an Asiatic lion.

Description
Litigons inherit and share characteristics with lions, the males sport manes and can also have rosettes.

History
The first attempt at breeding a litigon was successful; a female cub was born at the Alipore Zoo in Calcutta, India in 1971 to a female tigon named Rudrani and an Asiatic lion named Debabrata.

See also
Liliger

References

Panthera hybrids
Second generation hybrids